Eburia is a genus of beetles in the family Cerambycidae.

List of species 

 Eburia aegrota Bates, 1880
 Eburia albolineata Fisher, 1944
 Eburia aliciae Noguera, 2002
 Eburia amabilis Boheman, 1859
 Eburia bahamicae Fisher, 1932
 Eburia baroni Bates, 1892
 Eburia bimaculata Aurivillius, 1912
 Eburia blancaneaui Bates, 1880
 Eburia bonairensis Gilmour, 1968
 Eburia brevicornis Chemsak & Linsley, 1973
 Eburia brevispinis Bates, 1880
 Eburia brunneicomis Chemsak & Linsley, 1973
 Eburia cacapyra Martins, 1999
 Eburia caymanensis Fisher, 1941
 Eburia championi Bates, 1880
 Eburia charmata Martins, 1981
 Eburia chemsaki Noguera, 2002
 Eburia cinerea Franz, 1959
 Eburia cinereopilosa Fisher, 1932
 Eburia cinnamomea Fleutiaux & Sallé, 1889
 Eburia clara Bates, 1884
 Eburia concisispinis Fisher, 1941
 Eburia confusa Zayas, 1975
 Eburia consobrina Jacquelin du Val in Sagra, 1857
 Eburia consobrinoides Vitali, 2007
 Eburia copei Noguera, 2002
 Eburia crinitus Noguera, 2002
 Eburia cruciata (Linsley, 1935)
 Eburia cubae Fisher, 1932
 Eburia decemmaculata (Fabricius, 1775)
 Eburia dejeani Gahan, 1895
 Eburia didyma (Olivier, 1795)
 Eburia distincta Haldeman, 1847
 Eburia elegans Chemsak & Linsley, 1973
 Eburia elongata Fisher, 1932
 Eburia falli Linsley, 1940
 Eburia fisheri Russo, 1930
 Eburia frankiei Noguera, 2002
 Eburia fuliginea (Bates, 1872)
 Eburia giesberti Noguera, 2002
 Eburia haldemani LeConte, 1851
 Eburia hatsueae Chemsak & Giesbert, 1986
 Eburia hovorei Noguera, 2002
 Eburia inarmata Chemsak & Linsley, 1973
 Eburia inermis (Fleutiaux & Sallé, 1889)
 Eburia insulana Gahan, 1895
 Eburia jamaicae Fisher, 1942
 Eburia juanitae Chemsak & Linsley, 1970
 Eburia lanigera Linell, 1898
 Eburia laticollis Bates, 1880
 Eburia latispina Chemsak & Linsley, 1973
 Eburia lewisi Fisher, 1948
 Eburia linsleyi Lacey, 1949
 Eburia longicornis Fisher, 1932
 Eburia maccartyi Noguera, 2002
 Eburia macrotaenia Bates, 1880
 Eburia marginalis Fisher, 1947
 Eburia mutata Bates, 1884
 Eburia mutica LeConte, 1853
 Eburia nigrovittata Bates, 1884
 Eburia octomaculata Chevrolat, 1862
 Eburia opaca Chemsak & Linsley, 1973
 Eburia ovicollis LeConte, 1873
 Eburia paraegrota Chemsak & Linsley, 1973
 Eburia patruelis Bates, 1884
 Eburia pedestris White, 1853
 Eburia pellacia Zayas, 1975
 Eburia perezi Chemsak & Giesbert, 1986
 Eburia pilosa (Erichson in Meyens, 1834)
 Eburia pinarensis Zayas, 1975
 Eburia poricollis Chemsak & Linsley, 1973
 Eburia portoricensis Fisher, 1932
 Eburia porulosa Bates, 1892
 Eburia postica White, 1853
 Eburia powelli Chemsak & Linsley, 1970
 Eburia pseudostigma Lingafelter & Nearns, 2007
 Eburia quadrigeminata (Say, 1826)
 Eburia quadrimaculata (Linnaeus, 1767)
 Eburia quadrinotata (Latreille, 1811)
 Eburia ramsdeni Fisher, 1932
 Eburia ribardoi Noguera, 2002
 Eburia rotundipennis Bates, 1884
 Eburia rufobrunnea Perroud, 1855
 Eburia schusteri Giesbert, 1993
 Eburia semipubescens (Thomson, 1860)
 Eburia sericea Sallé, 1855
 Eburia sexnotata Boheman, 1859
 Eburia sordida Burmeister, 1865
 Eburia stigma (Olivier, 1795)
 Eburia stigmatica Chevrolat, 1834
 Eburia stroheckeri Knull, 1949
 Eburia submutata Chemsak & Linsley, 1973
 Eburia terroni Noguera, 2002
 Eburia tetrastalacta White, 1853
 Eburia thoracica White, 1853
 Eburia ulkei Bland, 1862
 Eburia velmae McCarty, 1993
 Eburia wappesi Noguera, 2002

References 

 
Eburiini
Cerambycidae genera